SMKC may refer to:
Kai Chung Secondary School, in Sarawak, Malaysia
Sekolah Menengah Kebangsaan Cyberjaya, a school in Selangor, Malaysia
, a Czech political party which is a member of the International Coordination of Revolutionary Parties and Organizations